The shortfin saury, Saurida argentea, is a species of lizardfish that lives mainly in the western Pacific Ocean.

Information
The shortfin saury is known to be found in a marine environment within a demersal depth range of about 1 – 70 meters. This species is native to a tropical environment. The maximum recorded length of the shortfin saury as an unsexed male is about 29 centimeters or about 11.4 inches. The species is known to be found in the areas of Western Pacific, the Gulf of Thailand, and northeastern Australia. It is common to find this species occupying coastal waters, sand, and mud bottoms. The human uses of this species include minor commercial use. This species is known to serve as no threat to humans and they are considered to be harmless.

Common names
The common names of the shortfin saury in different languages is as follows:
Al-alibot : Ilokano
Balanghuten : Tagalog
Balanghuten : Visayan
Basasong : Pangasinan
Bekut laut : Malay (bahasa Melayu)
Bubule : Tagalog
Butong-panday : Bikol
Cá Mối thường : Vietnamese (Tiếng Việt)
Chonor : Malay (bahasa Melayu)
Conor : Malay (bahasa Melayu)
Daldalag : Ilokano
Hai la : Malay (bahasa Melayu)
Kalaso : Tagalog
Karaho : Cebuano
Karaho : Hiligaynon
Kortfinnet øglefisk : Danish (dansk)
Kuti-kuti : Agutaynen
Mengkarong : Malay (bahasa Melayu)
Mengkerong : Malay (bahasa Melayu)
Short-finned lizardfish : English
Short-finned saury : English
Shortfin lizardfish : English
Shortfin saury : English
Talad : Waray-waray
Talho : Waray-waray
Tamangkah : Chavacano
Tigbasbay : Maranao/Samal/Tao Sug
Tigbasbay : Tagalog
Tiki : Bikol
Tiki : Davawenyo
Tiki : Wolof (Wollof)
Tiki-tiki : Cebuano
Tiki-tiki : Kuyunon
Tiki-tiki : Tagalog
Tiki-tiki : Visayan
Tuko : Tagalog
Ubi : Malay (bahasa Melayu)
短臂蛇鯔 : Mandarin Chinese
短臂蛇鲻 : Mandarin Chinese

References

Notes
 

Synodontidae
Fish described in 1881